Ivan Dmitriyevich Morozov (born May 5, 2000) is a Russian ice hockey forward currently playing for the Henderson Silver Knights of the American Hockey League (AHL) as a prospect for the Vegas Golden Knights of the National Hockey League (NHL). He was drafted in the second round, 61st overall, by Vegas in the 2018 NHL Entry Draft.

Playing career
During the 2019–20 season, Morozov was signed to a two-year contract extension by SKA Saint Petersburg on 29 January 2020.

In the midst of the 2021–22 season, Morozov collected 4 goals and 8 points in 17 games with SKA before he was traded to HC Sochi for the remainder of the season on 27 December 2021. In an increased role and ice-time, Morozov collected 1 goal and 3 points in just 5 games.

Morozov signed his two-year entry-level contract with the Vegas Golden Knights on April 26, 2022. Shortly afterwards, he signed a professional try-out agreement with their American Hockey League (AHL) affiliate, the Henderson Silver Knights, in order to finish out the 2021–22 AHL season.

Career statistics

Regular season and playoffs

International

References

External links

2000 births
Living people
Henderson Silver Knights players
Mamonty Yugry players
Russian ice hockey centres
SKA-1946 players
SKA-Neva players
SKA Saint Petersburg players
HC Sochi players
Vegas Golden Knights draft picks
People from Verkhotursky Uyezd
HC Yugra players